Glen Mary may refer to:
Glen Mary, Alabama
Glen Mary (Hancock County, Georgia), an NRHP
Glen Mary, California, former name of Owensville, California